The BL 10 inch guns Mks I, II, III, IV were British rifled breechloading 32-calibre naval and coast defence guns in service from 1885.

History 
The British 10-inch calibre originated with the Committee on Ordnance in 1879 when it ordered a new 10.4-inch gun together with the new 9.2-inch  as part of its transition from muzzle-loading to breech-loading guns. The proposed 10.4-inch gun eventually went into service in 1885 as a 10-inch gun firing a 500-pound projectile.

After Mk IV of 1889 the Royal Navy discontinued the 10-inch calibre in favour of 9.2-inch and 12-inch.

Naval service 

Mks II, III and IV guns were interchangeable and equipped the following warships :
 Victoria-class battleships laid down 1885
 Centurion-class battleships laid down 1890
 Renown laid down in 1893
 Devastation-class battleships as re-gunned in 1890

25-ton gun for Victoria 
A 25-ton version with a bore of 300 inches (30 calibres) and firing a 450-pound projectile was supplied in 1884 to the Australian colony of Victoria, mounted on the gunboat HMVS Victoria. This gun was subsequently replaced on Victoria by an 8-inch gun, and in 1887 was mounted at Fort Franklin as a coast defence gun.

Coast defence gun 
Mk I was an Elswick Ordnance design used only for coastal defence. Mks II, III and IV were interchangeable Woolwich Arsenal designs used on warships but also for coastal defense around the British Empire, some on disappearing carriages.

See also 
 List of naval guns

Surviving examples 
 Hong Kong Museum of Coastal Defence
 Portsea, Victoria, Australia
 Fort McNab, Halifax, Nova Scotia, Canada

Notes and references

Bibliography 
 Text Book of Gunnery , 1902. London: Printed for His Majesty's Stationery Office, by Harrison and Sons, St. Martin's Lane
 I. V.Hogg & L. F. Thurston, British Artillery Weapons & Ammunition 1914-1918. London: Ian Allan, 1972.
 Tony DiGiulian, British 10"/32 (25.4 cm) Marks I, II, III and IV

External links 

 Handbook for the 10 inch B. L. gun, 1892, 1895, 1900, 1904 at State Library of Victoria
 Instructions for 10 inch rifled breech loading Armstrong gun and automatic naval carriage and slide Describes 25-ton gun supplied to Victoria. From Australian National Archives
 Mk III disappearing mounting diagram at Victorian Forts and Artillery website
 Elswick Mk I coastal defence barbette mounting diagram at Victorian Forts and Artillery website

Naval guns of the United Kingdom
Coastal artillery
254 mm artillery
Victorian-era weapons of the United Kingdom
Disappearing guns